Roger Federer was the defending champion, but did not participate this year.

Feliciano López won the title, defeating Guillermo Cañas 6–4, 1–6, 7–5, 3–6, 7–5 in the final.

Seeds

Draw

Finals

Top half

Bottom half

External links
 Main draw

Vienna Open
2004 ATP Tour